Lake Akna is a small lake located in the Ararat plain west of Ejmiatsin in Armenia.

See also 
Lake Sevan
Ararat plain

References

Ayger
Geography of Armavir Province